Lucan Sarsfields (Irish: Sáirséalaigh Leamhcáin ) is a Gaelic Athletic Association club based in Lucan, Dublin, Ireland. It was founded in 1886, making it one of the oldest GAA clubs in Dublin. Sarsfields were one of 16 teams which contested the Dublin Senior Championship in 1887. They were also involved in the Senior Championship of 1892, and the club has fielded Gaelic football, hurling and camogie teams ever since.

Early success
Lucan won the Intermediate Football League in the 1904–05 season. It is reported that they did this with the help of five players from Balbriggan. The story goes that in 1902 a team call Balbriggan Wanderers won the Intermediate League and then for some reason or other went out of existence in 1904. One of the players on that team was a man named Paddy Richardson, who was a fish merchant and regularly attended the Dublin market. At the market he met up with Mickey Ashe who was secretary of Lucan and who also worked in the fish market. With the assistance of Tom Clarke, another fish market worker, the Balbriggan men were persuaded to throw in their lot with Lucan and the result was the winning of the league that year. The Lucan players who played on that team were M. O’Connor, P. Murray (Captain), J. Kelly, M. Downes (Treasurer), R. Kane (Vice Captain), M. Ashe (Secretary), J. Fagan, J. Murray, C. Brien, G. Thornberry, T. Kelly, J. Fitzpatrick (President), C.J. Keogh, R. Maher, T. Byrne, M. Merriman and J. Brien.
The same season also saw the hurlers win their league and being presented with the Michael Smith Cup. Lucan had to wait another 70 years to see this cup again when they won the Junior A League in 1974. A link between these two wins was Michael Downes who played on the 1905 team and his grandsons, Larry Downes and Dessie O’Brien who played on the 1974 team. Another link between both teams was Club President Tom Slattery, who attended both games.
In 1904–05 Lucan Sarsfields also won the Camogie Championship. Some of those who played on that team were Bridget Nugent, Annie Hughes, Kitty Brady, Dill Thornberry, Chrissie Murray, Margaret Feeney, Kate Nugent and Margaret Gannon.
The club's footballers were prominent in the 1920s and 1930s. The high point of this era was undoubtedly a famous victory over a star-studded Garda team in 1929 who were the Dublin Senior Football Championship winners at the time.

The hurlers captured the limelight in the 1960s winning the Junior 'B' Hurling League. They won the Corn Céitinn in 1966 and so became the first Junior Hurling team ever to capture this title.

Moving through the ranks
The club's footballers were back to the forefront in the 1970s with the help of the club's active juvenile section. The winning of the Dublin Junior Football Championship in 1977 and entry into Intermediate ranks quickly followed success at Under 21 level.

In 1988 a huge ambition was realised when Senior status was achieved. They beat St. Anne's in the Intermediate League Final. Some lean times followed and it reverted to Intermediate status.

1990s
After a magnificent campaign the footballers again achieved Senior status in 1995 with a thrilling Dublin Intermediate Football Championship victory over St Vincents after a replay in Lawless Park in Swords. Further success followed and the footballers now compete in Division 1 of the Senior Football League. 1998 was a tremendous year for its hurlers. The intermediate hurlers won three cup competitions, Corn Céitinn, Corn Fogarty and Corn. They followed up with a season to relish in 1999 winning the Intermediate League and Dublin Intermediate Hurling Championship and were competing in Division 2 of the Senior Hurling League.

Club grounds
For many years the club had no permanent pitches. In the early years, games were played at the 12 Lock, Bleach Green in the Demesne (close to Weir View), in a field behind Vesey Park and later on land belonging to Mr. Hickey in Doddsboro, Mr. Royce in Tandy's Lane and Mr. Kavanagh in Ballydowd, On the morning of a game some of the club members would go to one of these fields and erect posts which would have to be taken down that evening.
In 1952, the Dublin County Board leased grounds in Ballydowd, behind the Foxhunter Pub and gave the club official use of these grounds. This was home for the club for the next 18 years. Dressing rooms consisted of old wooden railway carriages - a far cry from some of the facilities that exist today but a lot more than some other clubs had at the time.
In 1970 however, the County Board lost control of the ground and the club was again homeless until granted the use of County Council pitches in Doddsboro where Airlie Heights is now situated.
1976 saw the club move again, this time to County Council grounds near Arthur Griffith Park.
It was around this time that the club realised the need for a home of its own and in 1978 the grounds at the 12th Lock were purchased from Shackletons for the sum of £51,500. Initial finance was provided by members by way of an interest free loan of £50 per head. The area of Lucan itself has expanded beyond all recognition during the period since the foundation of the club. In 1901 the population of the village of Lucan was recorded at 872, by 1981 it had increased to 13,508. Today the Lucan area is one of the fastest growing suburbs of Dublin with the present population estimated at 50,000 people living in the Lucan area. Lucan Sarsfields is continuing to grow with the community that it serves, because of the explosion in membership numbers a new clubhouse was built in 2001. The modern design includes a bar and function room, viewing balcony, 5 dressing rooms with showers, gym and club shop. The pitches in the 12th lock are known around the county for their excellent condition when it comes to championship. Sarsfields are currently planning to construct a state-of-the-art all-weather playing surface. This project was delayed by the ongoing saga between Thomas Davis GAA and Shamrock Rovers in South County Dublin. With the conclusion of this it is expected the new pitch should be ready by 2010.

All-weather pitch
The club has grown hugely over the past 10 years, with numbers of players and teams more than doubling in that period. Gaelic games is now a year-round activity and it is vital to have proper facilities to cope with the increased membership.
In response to this need, and to provide facilities for the future growth and development, the club decided to undertake a project to develop an all-weather playing facility at its grounds at 12th Lock.

It was decided that the training pitch would be developed into a 100 m × 60 m high-quality synthetic surface. Work commenced during the summer of 2009 and was completed by December 2009. The fully flood lit pitch suitable for all codes is enclosed in high-quality fencing and netting and was officially opened by the Taoiseach Brian Cowen in February 2010. He congratulated the club and the community in Lucan on bringing this project to fruition, especially in these times and stressed the importance of sport to young people's lives and to Irish culture. Club chairman, Paul Stapleton, thanked all who made the development possible, he acknowledged the support of local public representatives across all parties who did everything within their power to secure funding, and guide the club through the planning process. He went on to thank the club members who pulled out all the stops to raise funding locally through the €100 ticket draw and the people of Lucan who supported the draw.

Honours
2001
Minor 'B' Hurling Championship
Junior Ladies Football All-Ireland Champions

2003
U-15 'B' Hurling Championship 

2005
Minor 'A' Hurling Championship
Minor 'B' Football Championship

2006
Minor Hurling Div 1 champions
U-21 'A' Football Championship
Div 3 Football Feile Champions

2007
U-11 Div 1 Camogie Champions
U-11 'A' Camogie Championship
U-14 Div 2 Camogie Champions
Minor 'B' Hurling Championship

2008
Div 1 Dublin Camogie Feilé Champions
Div 1 All Ireland Camogie Feilé Champions

2009
Minor 'B' Football Championship

2010
U-14 Div 1 Camogie Champions
U-14 Div 3 Camogie Champions
U-14 'A' Camogie Championship
Div 1 Dublin Camogie Feilé Champions
Div 1 All Ireland Camogie Feilé Champions
Minor 'A' Camogie Championship
AFL 9 Junior Football League Winners
U-21 'A' Football Championship

2011
Div 2 Football Feilé Champions
U-13,14,15,16 Div 1 Camogie League and Championship double Champions
Minor 'A' Camogie Championship

2012

U-16 Div 7 Men's Football League

2013
U15 Dublin Hurling B Championship

2014
Dublin Under 21 Hurling Championship
U16 Dublin Hurling B Championship

2015
Dublin U12 Hurling League Division 2

2016
U14 Dublin Hurling Feile Division 1

U14 Dublin Football Feile Division 2

2018
Dublin U15 Football League Division 3

U14 Dublin Hurling Feile Division 1

2019
U14 Dublin Hurling Feile Division 1

2021
Dublin U21 D Hurling Championship

Dublin Minor Hurling League Division 4

Dublin Football A/B Shield

Full list of titles
 Dublin Senior Hurling Championship: Runner-Up 2013
 Dublin Intermediate Football Championship: Winner 1995
 Dublin Intermediate Hurling Championship; Winner 1999
 Dublin Junior Football Championship: Winner 1977, 2003
 Dublin Junior B Football Championship Winners 2001
 Dublin Junior B Hurling Championship Winner 2012
 Dublin Junior F Hurling Championship Winner 2013
 Dublin Under 21 Football Championship: Winner 2006, 2010
 Dublin Under 21 Hurling Championship: Winner 2014, 2019
 Dublin Minor B Football Championship Winners 2005, 2009, 2011
 Dublin Minor D Football Championship Winners 2007
 Dublin Minor A Hurling Championship Winner 2005
 Dublin Minor B Hurling Championship Winners 2001, 2007
 Dublin AFL Div. 7 Winner 2015
 Dublin AFL Div. 11 North Winner 2017

Notable players
 Jack Sheedy - former Dublin inter-county footballer.
 Tommy Carr - former Dublin inter-county footballer and manager.
 Paul Casey - former Dublin inter-county footballer and All Ireland Winner.
 Stephen O’Shaughnessy - former Dublin inter-county footballer.
 Kevin O'Reilly - former Dublin heavy weight inter-county hurler.
 John McCaffrey - current Dublin inter-county hurling captain
 Pádraig O'Driscoll - former Dublin inter-county Hurler
 Peter Kelly - Dublin inter-county hurler.

Gaelic games clubs in South Dublin (county)
Gaelic football clubs in South Dublin (county)
Hurling clubs in South Dublin (county)
1886 establishments in Ireland
Gaelic Athletic Association clubs established in 1886